The Ingp'o Line is an electrified railway line of the Korean State Railway in South P'yŏngan Province, North Korea, running from Kuhyŏng on the P'yŏngdŏk Line to Ingp'o.

Route 

A yellow background in the "Distance" box indicates that section of the line is not electrified.

References

Railway lines in North Korea
Standard gauge railways in North Korea